The 1974–75 season was Cambridge United's fifth season in the Football League.

Final league table

Results

Football League Fourth Division

FA Cup

League Cup

Squad statistics

References
 Cambridge 1974–75 at statto.com 
 Player information sourced from The English National Football Archive

Cambridge United F.C. seasons
Cambridge United